Gonbaleh may refer to:
 Gonbaleh, Asadabad
 Gonbaleh, Tuyserkan